Mir-Hamza Efendiyev ((born on November 15, 1950, Baku), is an Ambassador of the Republic of Azerbaijan. He was granted a diplomatic rank of Ambassador Extraordinary and Plenipotentiary on April 9, 1995.                                                                                    
From September 25, 2012 to December 15, 2016 he served as an Ambassador of the Republic of Azerbaijan in the Kingdom of the Netherlands and from October 31, 2012 to December 15, 2016 as the Permanent Representative to OPCW. Preceding this, he has also held several posts in Brussels, including Head of Mission of the Republic of Azerbaijan to NATO from May 13, 1998 to July 15, 2004, Head of Mission of the Republic of Azerbaijan to the European Union from August 27, 1996 to 2000, Ambassador of the Republic of Azerbaijan to the Kingdom of Belgium from April 9, 1995 to July 15, 2004. He was appointed as a Permanent Representative to the OPCW from May 9, 2000 to July 15, 2004. From July 15, 2004–22 October 2009 he served as an Ambassador of Azerbaijan in Greece.

Early life and political activity 
In 1990 he was elected as Member of Parliament (Supreme Soviet) of Azerbaijan SSR. He was one of 258 MP's who voted the passing of a law on" Restoration of Independence of Azerbaijan" on October 18, 1991. He was elected member of Parliamentary (National Assembly) Commission on Foreign Affairs as well as member of Legal and Political Committee of the Parliamentary assembly of the Black Sea Economic Cooperation.

Diplomatic career
On July 15t, 2004 , following the Order of the President of the Republic of Azerbaijan Ilham Aliyev,  Mir-Hamza Efendiyev was appointed Ambassador of the Republic of Azerbaijan to the Hellenic Republic.

Following the Order of the President dated September 25, 2012, Efendiyev was appointed Ambassador of the Republic of Azerbaijan to the Kingdom of the Netherlands.

References 

1950 births
Living people
Ambassadors of Azerbaijan to the Netherlands
Ambassadors of Azerbaijan to Belgium
Azerbaijani diplomats
Permanent Representatives of Azerbaijan to the Organisation for the Prohibition of Chemical Weapons
Politicians from Baku